

World & continental championship contests
World's Strongest Man 
Arnold Strongman Classic
Strongman Champions League
World Strongman Federation 
Giants Live
World Muscle Power Classic defunct
WSM Super Series Championship defunct
World Championship (IFSA) defunct
World Open (IFSA) defunct
World Strongman Challenge (IFSA) defunct
World Strongman Cup defunct
Fortissimus defunct
World Strongman Challenge defunct
Pure Strength defunct
Strongbow Superman
Le Defi Mark Ten International
World's Strongest Viking
 Liberty Strongman Classic (2003-2012 Philadelphia) defunct
Strongest Man Alive
World's Mightiest Man
Beauty and the Beast
Highlander World Championships

Team Events
IFSA World Team Championships
World's Strongest Team Olympics
Pure Strength
World's Strongest Team (Two men)
 Team World vs. Team USA (Philadelphia 2007)
World's Strongest Nation (Four men)
IFSA World Team Championships
World's Strongest Team Olympics
World Strongman Federation World Team Cup

Europe
Europe's Strongest Man
Europe's Strongest Man (IFSA)
Strongest Man of Europe
European Muscle Power Champs
European Hercules
European Open
European Strongman Classic
Team Events
Europes Strongest Team

North America
North America's Strongest Man
Pan-American Championships (IFSA)
North American Highlander Association (NAHA)

Grand Prix & international contests
Atlantic Giant/Faroe Grand Prix
Baltic Champion
Battle Of The Giants
Callander Grand Prix (Scotland)
Champions Trophy - Netherlands
Champions Trophy - Turkey
China Grand Prix
Clash of the Celtic Giants Ireland
Clash of Titans Scotland
Commonwealth Games Strongman 
Cyprus Grand Prix (IFSA)
Czech Grand Prix
Denmark Grand Prix
Denmark Grand Prix (IFSA)
Dubai Grand Prix (IFSA)
Finland Grand Prix
Fit Expo
Gatineau Hot Air Balloon Festival
Germany Grand Prix
Helsinki Grand Prix
Holland Grand Prix
Holland Grand Prix (IFSA)
Hresysti (Iceland Strength contest)
Hungary Grand Prix
Hungary Grand Prix (IFSA)
Hungary Grand Prix Olympic Strongest Man (IFSA) 
Ireland Grand Prix
Khanty-Mansijsk GP (WSF)
Kraftur Tournament
Las Vegas Grand Prix
Latvia Grand Prix (IFSA)
Lithuania Grand Prix (IFSA) 
Manfred Hoeberl Classic
MHP X-treme Strongman Challenge
Moscow Grand Prix (IFSA)
Moscow Grand Prix - Globe's Strongest Man
Nordic Championship (IFSA)
Nordic Strongman Competition
Nordics Strongest Man
Norway: Kristiansand Showlift Open
Polish Grand Prix
Romanian Grand Prix
Russia Grand Prix (IFSA) 
Russia Grand Prix
Serbia Grand Prix (IFSA/United Strongman Series)
Scandinavian Strongest Man
Scottish Power Challenge
Tornio-Haparanda (Finland) Grand Prix (IFSA)
Turkey Grand Prix
Ukraine Grand Prix (IFSA/United Strongman Series)
Ukraine
Viking of the North
World Record Breakers
WSF World Cup

National championship contests

European national championship contests
Austria Strongest Man
Austrian Summer Giants
Austrian Winter Giants
Battle Of The North
Belarus Strongest Man
Belgium's Strongest Man
Bulgaria Strongest Man
Czech Strongest Man
Cyprus Strongest Man
Denmark's Strongest Man
Denmark's Strongest Viking
Estonia's Strongest Man 
Faroe Islands Strongest Man
Finland's Strongest Man
Finland's Nationals
France's Strongest Man
Germany's Strongest Man
Strongest man of the Netherlands
Hungary's Strongest Man
Iceland's Strongest Man
Iceland's Strongest Man (IFSA)
Iceland's Strongest Viking
Italy's Strongest Man
Latvia's Strongest Man
Lithuania's Strongman Championships 
Norway's Strongest Man
Norway's Strongest Viking
Poland's Strongest Man
Portugal's Strongest Man
Romania's Strongest Man
Russia's Strongest Man
Slovenia's Strongest Man
Spain's Strongest Man
Sweden's Strongest Man
Strongest Man in Iceland

UK and Ireland
United Kingdom
Britain's Strongest Man 
UK Strongest Man
UK Championship (IFSA)
British Championships (IFSA)
Britain's Most Powerful Man
British Muscle Power Championship
UK Team Champs
UK Truck Pulling Championships - (Mercedes Benz)
National Truck Pulling Championships - (ASA/Bristol Street Motors)
British Truck Pulling Championships - (Commercial Vehicle Show at the NEC)
Regional
England's Strongest Man
Scotland's Strongest Man
Wales Strongest Man
Celtic Carnage - Wales' Biggest Indoor Strongest Man Competition
All Ireland Strongest Man
Northern Ireland (Ulster) Strongest Man
Ulster's Strongest Man
Republic of Ireland's Strongest Man
Western Isles Strongest man
Highland games
Orkney\Shetland's Strongest Man
CNP Professional Strongman Premier League
Midland's Strongest Man 
Corby Great Strength Eccleston
East Britain Strongest Man
North of England Strongest Man
Yorkshire's Strongest Man

Rest of the world national championship contests
All Africa Strongman
Australia's Strongest Man
Brazil Strongest Man
Canada's Strongest Man
China Strongest Man
Hawaii's Strongest Man
Iran's Strongest Man
New Zealand's Strongest Man 
Quebec Cup - Strongman series 
Quebec's Strongest Man
South Africa's Strongest Man
America's Strongest Man

AFSA contests
AFSA Austria Full Strength Challenge
AFSA Dubai Full Strength Challenge
AFSA International Champion
AFSA Oberhausen Full Strength Challenge
AFSA Las Vegas Full Strength Challenge
AFSA U.S.A Champion 
AFSA World Team Champion

Under 105K contests
World Championships u105k (IFSA) 
IFSA World Strongman Challenge u105k
Britain's Strongest Man u105k
UK's Strongest Man u105k
England's Strongest Man u105k 
Scotland's Strongest Man u105k 
Wales's Strongest Man u105k 
Canada's Strongest Man u105k 
Norway's Strongest Man u105k - Kristiansand Sowlift Open
Portugal's Strongest Man u105k

See also

List of professional bodybuilding competitions

References

strongman
Incomplete sports lists
Incomplete sports result lists